
Year 265 (CCLXV) was a common year starting on Sunday (link will display the full calendar) of the Julian calendar. At the time, it was known as the Year of the Consulship of Valerianus and Lucillus (or, less frequently, year 1018 Ab urbe condita). The denomination 265 for this year has been used since the early medieval period, when the Anno Domini calendar era became the prevalent method in Europe for naming years.

Events 
 By place 

 Roman Empire 
 Emperor Gallienus tries twice to crush the usurper Postumus, but on the first occasion Aureolus, commander of the elite cavalry, carelessly lets him escape. The second time, Gallienus sustains an arrow wound and has to break off his siege of a Gallic town where Postumus has holed up. He makes no other serious attempt to overcome his rival, instead devoting his attention to the political and military problems in the Danube and eastern parts of the Roman Empire.  
 Postumus makes no move to march on Rome and claim his territory south of Gaul. 
 Gallienus gives the order to fortify Milan and Verona. 
 Gallienus repels the invasion of the Goths in the Balkans. 
 A general of Gallienus' army, Victorinus, defects to Postumus.

 China  
 Sima Zhao, who had been the regent and de facto primary authority of the state of Cao Wei for little over 10 years by this point, passes away, leaving his authority to his eldest son, Sima Yan, who will go on to disestablish the state of Cao Wei in 266, founding the Jin dynasty.

Births 
 Eusebius of Caesarea, Greek historian (approximate date)

Deaths 
 September 6 – Sima Zhao, Chinese general and politician (b. 211)
 Ma Jun, Chinese engineer and inventor of the south-pointing chariot
 Zhu (or Jing), Chinese empress of the Eastern Wu state

References